Anton Johnson Brandt (21 March 1893 – 14 October 1951) was a Norwegian veterinarian.

He was born in Nesseby. He was a professor of pathological anatomy at the Norwegian School of Veterinary Science from 1941 to 1951, and rector there from 1948 to 1951. He edited the journal Norsk veterinærtidsskrift from 1931 to 1949, and co-edited Nordisk veterinærmedicin from 1948 to 1951.

References

1893 births
1951 deaths
People from Nesseby
Norwegian veterinarians
Academic staff of the Norwegian School of Veterinary Science
Rectors of the Norwegian School of Veterinary Science